Samuel Lane was an English painter.

Samuel Lane may also refer to:

 Samuel Armstrong Lane (1802–1892), English surgeon
 Samuel Johnathan Lane (1830–1891), English-born barrister and political figure in Ontario, Canada
 Samuel Lane (musician), British Christian musician and worship leader in the Vineyard Church
 Samuel M. Lane House, Marion, Iowa, listed on the NRHP in Linn County, Iowa

See also 
 Sam Lane (disambiguation)